Gábor Presser (born 27 May 1948) is a Kossuth Prize winning Hungarian musician, composer, singer. He was a band member in Locomotiv GT and Omega, and has been a prominent personality in Hungarian pop and rock music.

Biography 
Childhood

Born in Budapest in 1948, his parents are Géza Presser and Elvira Uhrman. His father worked as a poultry dealer in the Great Market hall at Klauzál square. After school his son, Gábor went out to help him. 
Gábor Presser started playing the piano at the age of four, the pianist Imre Antal also acknowledged the child's talents and predicted that he would become a great artist.
He finished the primary school in Kertész street, and subsequently started his studies at the Music High School, meanwhile he played piano at a street dancing school in Kapás street for a 14 HUF hourly rate.
He started to deal with composing as a teenager. The family lived at Dob street 46/B on the first floor, and above their home lived the composer and pianist Rezső Seress. 
Presser was already a teenager, and he often talked up Seress who showed him records and sheet music as well.  Seress was listening every day from 2 pm to 6 pm different arrangements of the Gloomy Sunday, which were broadcast to the surrounding homes.
Presser later reflected to these memories in his song Plafon, which Lajos Parti Nagy wrote the text.

Omega (1967–1971) (band)

Presser during high school was only interested in classical music at the time, but his classmate Tamás Mihály took him to concerts of the band Scampolo, where he was occasionally playing in. Starting 1967 Presser started to write his own songs for Omega (until then they were only playing covers of foreign hits.) In the summer, he became one of their musicians playing on keyboards. The band tried out a unique arrangements: no solo guitarist, but two keyboardists. The arrangement was not very successful and Presser was replaced by György Molnár guitarist. During this time, he played with Scampolo and started writing songs for László Komár. He was called back to be part of the band in 1968, just before the band's British tour. After a few singles, he became the main songwriter of Omega's first three albums and some of those he sang himself.

After Presser left the band (1971) he played again live with his bandmates on the Omega–LGT–Beatrice tour in 1980, at the 25 year anniversary concert in 1987, and later in 1994 and 1999. He also contributed to Omega's album titled Trans and Dance as songwriter for two songs, and as guest keyboardist.

Locomotiv GT (1971–1984)

Presser wanted more than to play Omega's music and quit the band to form Locomotiv GT with bass player Károly Frenreisz, guitarist Tamás Barta, and drummer József Laux. It was the first Hungarian so called 'supergroup'. All of the founding members, except Presser, left the group by 1977. The final line-up consisted of Presser, Tamás Somló, János Karácsony and János Solti. Presser wrote or co-wrote most of LGT's songs.

Additionally, Presser also got involved in theater work. His first musical appeared at the Vígszínház (Comedy Theatre of Budapest) in Budapest, an adaptation of Tibor Déry's novel titled An Imaginary Report from an American Pop Festival. Presser has written music for several theatre pieces at the Comedy Theatre of Budapest. He has been the music director of the theatre since 1978 and has his own evening shows there.

His first solo album came out in 1982, titled Electromantic, which was originally the music for a ballet piece titled The Rehearsal written for electric instruments. Part of the music was used as a title song for BBC's news program. La Baletta No. 2. was used as the title piece for the Budapest Regional News.

Since the 1970s Presser has written music for and collaborated with many Hungarian artists such as Sarolta Zalatnay, Ferenc Demjén, András Kern, Gyula Vikidál, Zorán, Kati Kovács, Klári Katona, and Sándor Révész.

The last LGT album was released in 1984.

Post LGT years

Presser started a new theatre production, which resulted in ‘A padlás’ (The Attic) in 1988. The first real Presser album was released in 1994 titled ‘Csak dalok’ (‘Only Tunes’) that was followed by  Kis történetek  (‘Little Stories’) in 1996.

Presser had 9 full house nights at the Comedy Theatre of Budapest in 1995, after them he stopped performing until 2001 when he did a 50 concert tour (this was recorded on CD/DVD).

After the year 1998 Presser has been releasing a new compilation album every couple of years.

Even though LGT dissolved in the 80s, they had a farewell concert in 1992. The recording of the farewell concert was released as an album. Later, they released two more albums with new material in 1997 and in 2002. They had a free concert in 1999, organized an LGT festival in 2002, and performed as the opening act at the Sziget Festival. They also performed a series of concerts in 2013.

In 2009, Presser himself held a concert celebrating his 40-year career with many musician guests. Some of the material from this concert is available on CD. In the two years that followed, Presser worked on a 74-minute album that was released in 2011, which consists of Lajos Parti Nagy’s poetry made into music.

In 2013, the Kanye West song "New Slaves" was nominated for a Grammy that contained about a minute long sample of Omega's 1969 song "Gyöngyhajú lány" (its music written by Presser). Although the sample was cleared by official label Hungaroton Records, the song was recorded without author's permission to change. In May 2016 songwriter Gábor Presser filed a lawsuit seeking $2.5 million in damages for copyright infringement for the use of the sample.

Discography

Albums
This is a simplified list that does not contain all the albums Presser appeared on as an artist.

Omega

 Trombitás Frédi és a rettenetes emberek (1968)
 Red Star from Hungary (1968)
 10000 lépés (1969)
 Ten Thousand Paces kiadatlan (1970)
 Éjszakai országút (1970)
 Kisstadion ’80 (1980)
 Ezüst eső - Vizesblokk (1994)
 A változás szele - Szárazblokk (1994)
 Trans and Dance (1995)
 Transcendent (1996)
 K O N C E Rt (1999)
 Tower of Babel maxi (2004)

Locomotiv GT

 Locomotiv GT (1971)
 Ringasd el magad (1972)
 Bummm! (1973)
 Locomotiv GT (1974) aka London 1973 (2001)
 All Aboard kiadatlan (1975)
 Mindig magasabbra (1975)
 In Warsaw (1975)
 Locomotiv GT V. (1976)
 Locomotiv GT (1976) aka Motor City Rock (1978)
 Zene – Mindenki másképp csinálja (1977)
 Mindenki (1978)
 Annyi mindent nem szerettem dupla kislemez EP (1979)
 Todos (1980)
 Locomotiv GT aka Budapest (1980)
 Kisstadion ’80 (1980)
 Loksi (1980)
 Locomotiv GT X. (1982)
 Too Long (1983)
 Azalbummm (1983)
 Első magyar óriás kislemez maxi (1984)
 Ellenfél nélkül (1984)
 Boxing kiadatlan (1985)
 '74 USA - New Yorktól Los Angelesig (1988)
 Zörr (1992)
 A Locomotiv GT összes kislemeze (1992)
 Búcsúkoncert (album) (1992)
 424 – Mozdonyopera (1997)
 A fiúk a kocsmába mentek (2002)
 Sziget 2007 maxi (2007)

Solo Albums

 Electromantic (1982)
 Electromantic – Extra változat 1982, 1987–1989 (1993)
 Csak dalok (1994)
 Kis történetek (1996)
 Angyalok és emberek (2000)
 Dalok régről és nemrégről – Koncert 2001 (2003)
 T12enkettő (2006)
 1 óra az 1 koncertből (2009)
 Rutinglitang (Egy zenemasiniszta); Parti Nagy Lajos Poetry (2011)
 13 dalunk (with Marian Falusi) (2017)

Theatre Pieces

 Képzelt riport egy amerikai popfesztiválról (1973, musical)
 Harmincéves vagyok (1975, musical)
 Jó estét nyár, jó estét szerelem (1977, musical)
 A sanda bohóc (1981, musical)
 A padlás (1988, musical)
 Szent István körút 14. (1998, musical)
 Túl a Maszat-hegyen (2005, bábmusical)
 Magyar Carmen (2007, táncdráma)

Compilation Albums

 A zeneszerző – Presser Gábor (talán) legszebb dalai (1998)
 A zeneszerző 2. – Presser Gábor talán leghangosabb dalai (2001)
 A zeneszerző 3. – Szerelmes dalok (2002)
 Presser zenés színháza (2002)
 A zeneszerző 4. – Presser Gábor legszínházibb dalai (2004)
 Dalok a színházból (2005)
 A zeneszerző 5. – A szövegíró (2007)

Albums for Other Artists

Kati Kovács
 Kovács Kati és a Locomotiv GT (1974)
 Közel a Naphoz (1976)
 Rock and roller – válogatás (1976)
 Kati – néhány dal (1976, NDK)

Klári Katona
 Titkaim (1981)
 Katona Klári (1984)
 Éjszakai üzenet (1986)
 Mozi (1989)

Ibolya Olah
 Voltam Ibojka (2018)

Zorán Sztevanovity
 Zorán (1977)
 Zorán II (1978)
 Zorán III (1979)
 Tizenegy dal (1982)
 Szép holnap (1987)
 Az élet dolgai (1991)
 Majd egyszer (1995)
 1997 (1997)
 Az ablak mellett (1999)
 Így alakult (2001)
 Közös szavakból (2006)
 Körtánc-Kóló (2011)

Sarolta Zalatnay
 Álmodj velem (1972)

Prizes
 Pop-Match – Songwriter of the Year (1976)
 Erkel Award (1977)
 Pop-Meccs – Songwriter of the Year (1977)
 Pop-Meccs – Keyboardist of the Year (1978)
 Pop-Meccs – Keyboardist of the Year (1980)
 eMeRTon Award (1986, 1990, 1994, 2000)
 Merit Award (1990)
 Order of Merit of the Republic of Hungary (1994)
 Huszka Jenő Award (1995)
 Golden Giraffe Life Accomplishment Award (1998)
 Huszka Jenő Life Accomplishment Award (1999)
 Kossuth Prize (2003)
 Prima Primissima Award (2004)
 Gundel Artist Award (2004)
 Pro Urbe Budapest Award (2009)
 Artisjus Award – The Best Pop Music Production of the Year (2009)
 Radnóti Miklós Anti-Racism Award (2011)
 Story Five Star Award (together with the other LGT members) - The Best Music Production of the Year (2014)
 Human Voice Life Accomplishment Award (2018)

References

External links
 Gábor Presser official website
 Gábor Presser on IMDb
 Gábor Presser lyrics
 Gábor Presser discography

1948 births
Living people
20th-century Hungarian male singers
Hungarian musicians
Hungarian Jews
Hungarian musical theatre composers
Locomotiv GT members
21st-century Hungarian male singers